The 1900 VFL season was the fourth season of the Victorian Football League (VFL), the highest level senior Australian rules football competition in Victoria. The season featured eight clubs, ran from 5 May until 22 September, and comprised a 14-game home-and-away season followed by a finals series featuring all eight clubs.

The premiership was won by the Melbourne Football Club for the first time, after it defeated  by four points in the 1900 VFL Grand Final on 22 September.

Premiership season
In 1900, the VFL competition consisted of eight teams of 18 on-the-field players each, with no "reserves", although any of the 18 players who had left the playing field for any reason could later resume their place on the field at any time during the match.

Each team played each other twice in a home-and-away season of 14 rounds.

Once the 14 round home-and-away season had finished, the 1900 VFL Premiers were determined by the specific format and conventions of the 1898 VFL Premiership System.

Round 1

Round 2

Round 3

Round 4

Round 5

Round 6

Round 7

Round 8

Round 9

Round 10

Round 11

Round 12

Round 13

Round 14

Round 3 (rescheduled)
The postponed games from Round 3 were played on 18 August 1900 – results are included under Round 3 (above).

Win/Loss Table

Bold – Home game
X – Bye
Opponent for round listed above margin

Ladder

Ladder Progression
No ladder for finals in 1900.

Finals

Sectional Round 1

Sectional Round 2

Sectional Round 3

Section A ladder

Section B ladder

Semi final

Grand final

Melbourne defeated Fitzroy 4.10 (34) to 3.12 (30). (For an explanation of scoring see Australian rules football).

Awards
 The 1900 VFL  Premiership team was Melbourne.
 The VFL's leading goalkicker was Albert Thurgood of Essendon with 25 goals.

Notable events
The Round 1 match between St Kilda and Melbourne ended in a draw, but the result was changed to a St Kilda victory on protest after it was noted that the umpire did not signal the end of the third quarter in the correct fashion after hearing the bell. This was St Kilda's first ever VFL win (after 48 losses), their first win since 1896 in the VFA (after 51 losses), and was the first of only two occasions that the score of a game has been changed on protest (the second was the 2006 AFL siren controversy between St Kilda and ).
 St Kilda footballer Dave Strickland, the father of Shirley Strickland, won the 1900 Stawell Gift in 12 seconds off a handicap of 10 yards. 
 Collingwood's highly talented "loose cannon" Dick Condon was given a lifetime suspension for sustained abuse of field umpire Henry "Ivo" Crapp.
 By the end of the finals round-robin matches, more than 1,000 points had been scored against St Kilda in a single season.
 Melbourne won the 1900 premiership despite having a 6-8 record after the home-and-away matches and finishing sixth of the eight teams on the ladder. This unsatisfactory situation led to the formation of the Argus Final Four system for 1901, which was modified in 1902 and 1907 and used until 1930 (except for 1924).

Footnotes

References
 Hogan, P., The Tigers Of Old, The Richmond Football Club, (Richmond), 1996. 
 Rogers, S. & Brown, A., Every Game Ever Played: VFL/AFL Results 1897–1997 (Sixth Edition), Viking Books, (Ringwood), 1998. 
 Ross, J. (ed), 100 Years of Australian Football 1897–1996: The Complete Story of the AFL, All the Big Stories, All the Great Pictures, All the Champions, Every AFL Season Reported, Viking, (Ringwood), 1996.

External links
 1900 Season - AFL Tables

Australian Football League seasons
VFL season